Baumstein is a German surname. Notable people with the surname include:

 Moysés Baumstein (1931–1991), Brazilian artist

Fictional characters:
 Lina Baumstein and Max Baumstein, in the 1982 film The Passerby

German-language surnames